The Heuneburg is a prehistoric hillfort by the river Danube in Hundersingen near Herbertingen, between Ulm and Sigmaringen, Baden-Württemberg, in the south of Germany, close to the modern borders with Switzerland and Austria. It is considered to be one of the most important early Celtic centres in Central Europe. Apart from the fortified citadel, there are extensive remains of settlements and burial areas spanning several centuries.

It stood on a strategically positioned mountain spur that rises steeply 40 m above the Danube. It is at the centre of a fertile river plain, surrounded by rolling hill country.

The settlement has been called "oldest city north of the alps".

Discovery and excavations
The site was first noted in the 1820s. In 1882,  recognised its importance and correctly identified it as a prehistoric fortification. He misidentified the lower fortifications as medieval. Some of the nearby burial mounds were opened in the 19th century.

Sporadic excavation on the citadel began in the 1920s. In the 1930s, the Hohmichele mound was examined (see below).

Since 2003, the Heuneburg is one of the foci of a multi-disciplinary research project on early Celtic centres undertaken by the Deutsche Forschungsgemeinschaft. New excavations began in 2004.

History

Although best known for its role as an important early Celtic centre from the 7th to 5th centuries BC, the Heuneburg was occupied at several other points during its history.

The first settlement on the site dates to the Middle Bronze Age (15th to 12th century BC) during the Tumulus culture period. At this time, the main plateau was fortified with a massive ditch-and-bank enclosure, including a wooden wall. The settlement was abandoned at the beginning of the Urnfield period. This abandonment apparently did not entail a violent destruction. During the Urnfield period, there was a burial area in the location of the later Südsiedlung (see below).

The citadel was reoccupied and refortified around 700 BC; adjacent areas were occupied at the same time, including Alte Burg and Grosse Heuneburg. The Heuneburg complex developed briskly, and by 600 BC, it was one of the key centres of power and trade in Celtic/Halstatt Southern Germany. Major changes in internal structure occurred around that time. Before 500 BC, the site suffered a major destruction, followed by a second flourish and a further destruction in the 5th century BC. It used to be assumed that the Heuneburg was abandoned by the La Tène period, but recent evidence does not fully support this view.
The conjunction of a prominent fortified site, elaborate burials, specialised craft production and trade of valuable imported goods class the Heuneburg with a small group of similar important early Celtic sites, the so-called Fürstensitze (see below).

The strategic location of the Heuneburg led to some activity in the Middle Ages, although no permanent occupation occurred at that time.

The Celtic citadel

The main  plateau on the mountain spur, 40m above the Danube and naturally defensible, was the centre of high-status occupation and of fortification in Celtic periods. It measures only  but is the main visual landmark in the area. From c. 700 BC onwards, it was the centre of a large settlement.

The main settlement on the citadel underwent several changes during its existence. As the houses were built of wood and daub, and the fortifications mostly of wood and earth, they were replaced frequently. This resulted in over a dozen identifiable occupation phases, representing at least 250 years of activity.

The plateau was refortified from c. 700 BC onwards. Originally, the fortification took the form of a classic Celtic wood-and-earth wall (murus gallicus), replaced regularly.

Around 600 BC, this was replaced by a structure without parallel in contemporary Celtic Europe. A limestone foundation supported a sun-dried mudbrick wall of c.  height, probably topped by a roofed walkway, thus reaching a total height of 6 m. The wall was clad with bright white lime plaster, regularly renewed; this was necessary to prevent the northern weather from eroding the unbaked mudbrick.  Towers protruded outwards from the wall at intervals. It must have been widely visible in the area, as the modern reconstruction of a section is.  No other mudbrick structures are known from Celtic Central Europe at this time. It is generally accepted that this structure imitated contemporary walls in the Mediterranean region.

The wall lasted c. 70 years (much longer than its wood-and-earth predecessors and successors which had to be renewed frequently). After a fiery destruction around 530 BC, the settlement was defended by a murus gallicus again until a further destruction in the 5th century.

The fortification had two monumental gates, one to the west, giving access to the outer settlements, and another to the east, probably to a steep road leading directly to the Danube (and perhaps a harbour).

The citadel contained a regular system of streets and houses. It appears that the settlement underwent a major reorganisation after 600 BC, after which the dwellings were much more densely and regularly spaced than before. At all times, the Heuneburg houses are of remarkably large size and elaboration compared to contemporary settlements. The uniform buildings probably served as dwellings and workshops. There is evidence for an active metal industry, including a bronze workshop in the southeast corner of the citadel.
After the 530 BC destruction of the mudbrick wall, the internal arrangements underwent some changes. The workshops were moved to the north. A very large house was built in the southeast corner. This is sometimes interpreted as a Herrenhaus, i.e. the dwelling of a local ruler.

The Heuneburg yielded many finds marking it as a rich site, operating both as a local centre of production and as a hub for long-distance trade. These included a full bronze workshop, a high proportion of Greek vases (in fact, the fragments make up about a dozen Greek pots, indicating a larger amount than contemporary sites but also a very limited elite access to such material), and other imported raw materials like tin and amber. Much of the exotic material dates from after 530 BC. There was also a local tradition of producing painted and decorated (incised or stamped) pottery.

Settlements outside the citadel
Recent work in and around the Heuneburg has produced groundbreaking information regarding the full extent of the settlement. It now appears that the citadel was only a small, if focal, part of the overall complex at most times.

The Aussensiedlung 

The Aussensiedlung was located downslope, immediately to the west and northwest of the citadel. It was probably occupied from the 7th century (Hallstatt period) to the 5th century BC. It appears to have existed as a separate fortified settlement.
The Aussensiedlung covered up to 100 hectares, many times the area of the citadel proper. It appears to have consisted of separate fenced or palisaded lots, each containing a main dwelling, storage areas and much terrain for fields. It is suggested that each of the lots functioned as a separate farmstead, supporting an extended family.
A population of 5,000 to 10,000 individuals is estimated just for the Aussensiedlung. The area enclosed could never have sufficed to produce the amounts of food necessary to feed such a population.
The Giessübel mounds (see below) are erected on top of the remains of part of the Aussensiedlung and must thus postdate it.

The Südsiedlung 
The Südsiedlung ("south settlement") further south appears to have been similar to the Aussensiedlung in character and chronology and may indeed have been contiguous with it.

Vorwerke (lower fortifications)
The huge fortifications recognised in the 19th century, but then misinterpreted as medieval, are also part of the Celtic complex. They have been partially obliterated by erosion and ploughing. A triple system of several hundred metres of banks and ditches enclosed and subdivided the lower terrain just west of the Heuneburg proper. Since they partially overlay the Aussensiedlung houses, the walls must have been erected in a later phase.

The gate
Recent excavations have revealed a monumental gate in the westernmost wall. Measuring , it was a massive construction. Its walls had a core of limestone set in a fine clay mortar, and were faced on each side with fine limestone ashlar masonry. Like the mudbrick wall on the citadel, this feature is exceptional in the Celtic world and resembles contemporary Mediterranean architecture.

Iron Age cemeteries

Several burial areas surround the Heuneburg. They consist of clusters of earthen tumuli or burial mounds. More than 50 such monuments are known in the area. Not all have been excavated. Some date from the Hallstatt period, but most are probably La Tène.
The relationship between prominent fortified sites and elaborate burials is also known from other important Celtic centres, like Glauberg oppidum and grave, the Hochdorf Grave near the Hohenasperg settlement and the Vix grave near Mont Lassois.

Giessübel
It was built on top of the then abandoned west part of the Aussensiedlung. First excavations were undertaken in the 19th century (mounds 2 and 3), but more systematic work took place between the 1950s and 1980s.

Grave 1
This mound contained a rectangular wooden chamber. Its main occupant was a man aged around 50. There were also remains of two women. It had been robbed in antiquity, but modern archeological finds nevertheless included weapons, gold and bronze attachments for garments, and some amber plaques that probably once adorned a kline (couch) imported from the Mediterranean. Twenty further burials were later placed in and on the same mound.

Grave 4
Grave 4, also robbed, contained a single individual, accompanied by the remains of metal attachments from a wooden chariot.

Hohmichele

It consists of at least 36 burial mounds. The group is named after its largest mound, the Hohmichele. It is located near Altheim (Biberach district). Most of the mounds are not visible any more due to natural erosion and ploughing. The 14 or so that remain are located in forests.

Excavation
The first excavation of the main Hohmichele mound took place from 1936 to 1938, directed by Gustav Riek as part of the research programme of the SS-Ahnenerbe. Only about a third of the mound was removed during that project; the central burial chamber was located. After the war, from 1954 to 1956, Siegwalt Schiek undertook further excavations.

The Hohmichele mound
Excavation has mainly concentrated on its central and eastern portions. The mound was used from the late 7th to the late 6th century BC. 13 burials were located within the mound, several of them accompanied by grave offerings.
The mound was restored to its original dimensions in 1960. Today, it is visible as a vegetation-covered landmark in a small forest clearing. A modern war memorial is located on its summit.

Grave I
The centre of the mound contained an oak-built main chamber (Grave I), built on the original ground level. It measured  and was c.  high. This grave, containing a man and a woman, had already been plundered shortly after the burial. The remaining finds, reflecting its original riches include horse trappings, nearly 600 glass beads from a necklace, pieces of amber, and fine gold threads that were originally part of a brocade-like fabric. The floor had been covered with cowskins.

Grave VI
This grave also contained a man and a woman. Their equipment included a four-wheeled chariot with trappings for two horses, bronze eating and drinking vessels, a quiver with 51 iron arrowheads, an iron knife and many amber and glass beads (from necklaces), including 2,300 green glass beads. The woman had been laid in the chariot, the man on the floor. The bronze vessels were placed by their feet and heads. There were also remains of embroidered fabrics.

Grave IX
Its occupant was a woman who had died between 18 and 30 years of age, her remains accompanied by two bronze armlets and over 20 pottery vessels with incised and stamped decorations and red paint.

Other graves
Six further graves (II-V, VII, VIII) were inhumations. 22 fireplaces found within the mound are probably connected to cult activity. Some or all of them may represent funerary pyres.

Gallery

Interpretation and significance

There can be no doubt that the Heuneburg and its associated monuments are one of the most important centres of the early Celtic Iron Age in Central Europe. It is also clear that the site should be seen in a context with other prominent centres of its time, the so-called Fürstensitze (German: "princely seats" - see below).

Social/economic development
The Heuneburg settlement reflects important sociopolitical developments in early Celtic Europe. It appears to be the case that after 700 BC, in some regions, wealth and population became concentrated in relatively small areas, a development that further accelerated after 600 BC. 
A growing differentiation in terms of wealth that is visible among settlements sites but especially among burials, indicates the development of social hierarchies. This is illustrated by the discovery, in 2005, of the burial of a 2-year-old child near the Heuneburg, accompanied by imported (Etruscan) jewellery. It is clear that a young child could not have earned or gained such wealth, hence the individual must have been born rich. There is probably also an element of political centralisation involved in these processes. The fact that the Heuneburg and Aussensiedlung were not able to locally produce enough food to support their own populations implied quite clearly that they must have been able to receive and maintain the support of a much larger surrounding area.
The ongoing social and professional specialisation had led to the development of specialised workshops, perhaps even artisanal quarters that did not just produce to serve local needs.

The term Fürstensitz
The traditional term Fürstensitz ("princely seat") to describe sites like Heuneburg has been criticised recently, especially by the archaeologist Manfred Eggert (University of Tübingen). It could be argued that the phrase implies a potentially misleading interpretation of power structures, potentially distracting from more complex realities.

Interaction with other sites

Several other hilltop sites came into existence in the broader region at the same time as the Heuneburg, about 700 BC. Initially, they may have been similar in size and population. Strikingly, most of them were abandoned around 600 BC, i.e. when the Heuneburg settlement was reorganised. It is possible that the Heuneburg had become so powerful as to attract population at the expense of other sites.
There is no clear evidence for such an interpretation, especially as the abandonment of the Heuneburg area is now in doubt (see below).

Destructions, abandonment, and continuity
The traditional view that the two main destructions of the citadel fortifications are the result of violent destruction, and that the Heuneburg was abandoned after the second destruction, which may have been part of a power struggle with Honenasperg, have lost some ground recently.
It remains likely that the mudbrick fortification was indeed destroyed violently, but there is no exact evidence to indicate whether this may have been the result of external warfare or of internal difficulties. The renewed economic flourish after this event may argue against a wholesale destruction of the site. 
The second destruction, in the 5th century, is even more problematic. It has been argued that the fire or fires could be accidental. It is also important to note that although the Heuneburg plateau is mostly abandoned at this time, as is the Aussensiedlung, smaller settlements develop in the surrounding area and burial activity continues, perhaps suggesting a change in the focus of settlement activity, possibly connected with sociopolitical changes at that time.

Climate
It has been proposed that the flourishing of Celtic cultures between the 7th and 5th centuries BC is connected with a warm phase that coincided with that period. A milder climate would have permitted more successful agriculture, which would, in turn, have allowed for larger populations, and thus for the development of more complex political, social and artisanal specialisations. The end of this mild period would have led to population losses and to a collapse of the established economic systems. The demise of centres like the Heuneburg, but also the 4th century Celtic migrations could be connected with such events.

Trade, contacts with the Classical World
The importance of the Heuneburg, like that of other contemporary centres, is closely connected with its location in relation to several important trade routes. Placed just north of the Alps and on the Danube, the site had access to important land routes across the mountains from Italy and Southern France (especially the Greek colony of Massalia), and, by river, to the Balkans and the Black Sea. It was involved in long-distance trade between northern and southern Europe, involving luxury goods (as found in the burial mounds) and probably wine from the south, and amber, metals, as well as probably perishables like leather and fur, from the north.
The Mediterranean (Greek and/or Etruscan) influence on the Heuneburg is especially strongly reflected by its mudbrick fortification and the newly found ashlar masonry.

Pyrene?
In the mid-5th century BC, the Greek historian Herodotus (Book 2.33) made a brief passing reference to a Celtic city called by the Greek "Pyrene": "For the Ister flows from the land of the Celts and the city of Pyrene through the very middle of Europe..."  Since the Heuneburg is roughly in the right location and was a major regional centre just before that time, it is possible that it is the settlement referred to by that name.

Museums
The Heuneburgmuseum is located in the renovated barn of the former monastery of Heiligkreuztal at Hundersingen. The exhibition  explains the importance of the site and displays some of the original finds from the site and nearby burials.

In recent years, an open-air museum has been erected on the Heuneburg plateau itself. It includes reconstructions of several houses and of part of the mudbrick wall.

Some of the finds from the Hohmichele grave are partially on display in the Württemberg State Museum (Stuttgart).

See also
Glauberg
Vix Grave and Mont Lassois
Hohenasperg
Hochdorf Chieftain's Grave
Ipf
Burgstallkogel
Alte Burg
Große Heuneburg (Upflamör)
Bettelbühl burial ground
Grafenbühl grave
Grächwil
Oppidum of Manching

External links 

Official website of the Heuneburg Museum
Heuneburg Pyrene
 Crossing the Alps: Early Urbanism between Northern Italy and Central Europe, 900-400 BC (2020)
Detailed report in English on German Historical Museum website 
Information on the DFG project
Detailed article from "Der Spiegel", November 2006
Detailed article in "Die Zeit", October 2006
April 2006 report from Süddeutscher Rundfunk, with images
November 2005 report from Deutschlandfunk
Text of a detailed seminar about the Hallstatt sequence on the plateau. Many illustrations.
Recent excavations at the Heunenburg (2000-2020)
Der Schatz im Keltengrab (2014) - Documentary with digital reconstructions of the Heuneburg

Bibliography

Further reading (a selection)
 Jörg Bofinger: Archäologische Untersuchungen in der Vorburg der Heuneburg - Siedlung und Befestigungssysteme am frühkeltischen Fürstensitz an der oberen Donau, Gde. Herbertingen-Hundersingen, Kreis Sigmaringen. In: Archäologische Ausgrabungen in Baden-Württemberg 2004. P. 82–86. Theiss, Stuttgart 2005. 
 Jörg Bofinger: Stein für Stein ... Überraschende Befunde im Bereich der Befestigungssysteme der Heuneburg-Vorburg, Gde. Herbertingen-Hundersingen, Kreis Sigmaringen. In: Archäologische Ausgrabungen in Baden-Württemberg 2005. P. 73–78. Theiss, Stuttgart 2006. 
 Egon Gersbach: Die mittelbronzezeitlichen Wehranlagen der Heuneburg bei Hundersingen a.D. In: Arch. Korrespondenzblatt. 1973, 3, P. 417–422.
 Wolfgang Kimmig: Die Heuneburg an der oberen Donau. Führer arch. Denkm. Bad.-Württ. Stuttgart, Theiss 1983.
 Dirk Krausse, Manuel Fernández-Götz, Leif Hansen, Inga Kretschmer, The Heuneburg and the Early Iron Age Princely Seats: First Towns North of the Alps. Budapest, Archeolingua 2016.
 Manuel Fernández-Götz, Dirk Krausse, Rethinking Early Iron Age Urbanisation in Central Europe: The Heuneburg Site and its Archaeological Environment. Antiquity 87(336), 2013, P. 473-487.
 Siegfried Kurz: Die Heuneburg-Außensiedlung (Forschungen und Berichte zur Vor- und Frühgeschichte in Baden-Württemberg vol. 72), Stuttgart 2000
 Siegfried Kurz, Siegwalt Schiek: Bestattungsplätze im Umfeld der Heuneburg. (Forschungen und Berichte zur Vor- und Frühgeschichte in Baden-Württemberg vol. 87), Stuttgart 2002
 Siegfried Kurz: Die Heuneburg bei Herbertingen-Hundersingen, Kreis Sigmaringen, und ihr Umland. Zum Abschluss des DFG-Projektes. In: Archäologische Ausgrabungen in Baden-Württemberg 2003. P. 62–65. Theiss, Stuttgart 2004.

Heuneburg studies
The excavations have led to the publication of a series of specialised monographs on the Heuneburg. 11 volumes have been published so far:
 Gustav Riek: Der Hohmichele. Ein Fürstengrabhügel der späten Hallstattzeit. Heuneburgstudien 1, Röm.-German. Forsch. 26, Berlin 1962
 Günter Mansfeld: Die Fibeln der Heuneburg 1950-1970. Heuneburgstudien 2, Röm.-German. Forsch. 33, Berlin 1973 	
 Amei Lang: Die geriefte Drehscheibenkeramik der Heuneburg 1950-1970 und verwandte Gruppen. Heuneburgstudien 3, Röm.-German. Forsch. 34, Berlin 1974			
 Heinz-Werner Dämmer: Die bemalte Keramik der Heuneburg. Heuneburgstudien 4, Röm.-German. Forsch. 37, Mainz 1978	
 Susanne Sievers: Die Kleinfunde der Heuneburg. Heuneburgstudien 5, Römisch-Germanische Forschungen 42 Mainz, 1984	
 Egon Gersbach: Ausgrabungsmethodik und Stratigraphie der Heuneburg. Heuneburgstudien 6, Röm.-German. Forsch. 45, Mainz 1988	
 Daniela Fort-Linksfeiler: Die Schüsseln und Schalen der Heuneburg. Heuneburgstudien 7, Röm.-German. Forsch. 47, Mainz 1989
 Helga van den Boom: Großgefäße und Töpfe der Heuneburg. Heuneburgstudien 8, Röm.-German. Forsch.51, Mainz 1991
 Egon Gersbach: Baubefunde der Perioden IVc - IVa der Heuneburg. Heuneburgstudien 9, Röm.-German. Forsch. 53, Mainz 1995
 Egon Gersbach: Baubefunde der Perioden IIIb - Ia der Heuneburg. Heuneburgstudien 10, Röm.-German. Forsch. 56, Mainz 1996
 Wolfgang Kimmig (Hrsg.): Importe und mediterrane Einflüsse auf der Heuneburg. Heuneburgstudien 11, Röm.-German. Forsch. 59, Mainz 2000

References

Buildings and structures in Sigmaringen (district)
Oppida
Hill forts in Germany
Archaeological sites in Germany
Iron Age sites in Europe
Tumuli in Germany
Former populated places in Germany